Ferdinand Vetter (3 February 1847, in Osterfingen – 6 August 1924, in St. George's Abbey, Stein am Rhein) was a Swiss Germanist and medievalist.

In 1866–68 He studied under philologist Wilhelm Wackernagel and historian Jacob Burckhardt at the University of Basel, then continued his education at the universities of Berlin and Göttingen. Following graduation, he taught classes at the cantonal school in Chur, and from 1874 worked as a schoolteacher in Aarau. In 1876 he became an associate professor at the University of Bern, where in 1886 he was appointed professor of German philology. In 1909/10 he served as university rector.

In 1891 he founded the magazine Schweizerische Rundschau, of which he worked as editor until 1897. He is credited with the restoration of Sankt-Georgen monastery at Stein am Rhein, which had been taken over by his father.

Selected works 
 Zum Muspilli und zur germanischen Allitterationspoesie, 1872 – On Muspilli and Germanic alliteration poetry.
 Ueber die sage von der herkunft der Schwyzer und Oberhasler aus Schweden und Friesland, 1877 – On the legend of the origin of the Schwyz and Oberhasli from Sweden and Friesland.
 Das Sankt-Georgen-Kloster in Stein am Rhein, 1884 – St. George's monastery in Stein am Rhein.
 Das Schachzabelbuch Kunrats von Ammenhausen, 1892 – The chessbook of Konrad von Ammenhausen.
 Die neuentdeckte deutsche Bibeldichtung des neunten Jahrhunderts, 1885 – A newly discovered German bibliography of the 9th century.
 Jeremias Gotthelf: Volksausgabe seiner Werke im Urtext (10 volumes, 1898) – Jeremias Gotthelf; edition of his works in the original text.

References 

1847 births
1924 deaths
Germanic studies scholars
People from the canton of Schaffhausen
University of Basel alumni
Humboldt University of Berlin alumni
University of Göttingen alumni
Academic staff of the University of Bern
Germanists
Swiss medievalists